Piranga is a Brazilian municipality located in the state of Minas Gerais. The city belongs to the mesoregion of Zona da Mata and to the microregion of Viçosa.  As of 2020, the estimated population was 17,634.

See also
 List of municipalities in Minas Gerais

References

Municipalities in Minas Gerais